Magigram was a magic magazine published by Supreme Magic in Bideford, England from September 1966 – February 1995. It started as a bimonthly magazine but became monthly in September 1971. It was edited for its whole run by Ken de Courcy. A complete file contains 306 issues and over 20,000 pages.

References

Monthly magazines published in the United Kingdom
Bi-monthly magazines published in the United Kingdom
Defunct magazines published in the United Kingdom
Magic periodicals
Magazines established in 1966
Magazines disestablished in 1995